Soft Winds (subtitled The Swinging Harp of Dorothy Ashby) is an album by jazz harpist Dorothy Ashby recorded in 1961 and released on the Jazzland label.
The album takes its name from Goodman's 1940 standard "Soft Winds" which features as the first track.

Reception

Users on Allmusic have awarded the album an average of 3 stars.

Track listing 
All compositions by Dorothy Ashby except as indicated
 "Soft Winds" (Benny Goodman) – 2:56   
 "Wild Is the Wind" (Dimitri Tiomkin, Ned Washington) – 4:21   
 "The Man I Love" (George Gershwin, Ira Gershwin) – 2:56   
 "My Ship" (Kurt Weill, Ira Gershwin) – 3:40   
 "Love Is Here to Stay" (George Gershwin, Ira Gershwin) – 2:42   
 "I've Never Been in Love Before" (Frank Loesser) – 2:27   
 "With Strings Attached" – 2:25   
 "Laura" (Johnny Mercer, David Raksin) – 2:59   
 "The Guns of Navarone" (Tiomkin) – 2:15   
 "Misty" (Erroll Garner) – 2:42   
 "The Gypsy in My Soul" (Clay Boland, Moe Jaffe) – 2:49

Personnel 
Dorothy Ashby – harp
Terry Pollard – piano, vibraphone
Herman Wright – bass
Jimmy Cobb – drums

Production
John Levy – producer
Ray Fowler – engineer

References

External links
A Dorothy Ashby Discography

Dorothy Ashby albums
1961 albums
Jazzland Records (1960) albums